The 2022 Liga 1 U-16  (known as the Mola Elite Pro Academy Liga 1 U-16 2022 for sponsorship reasons) was the fourth season of the Liga 1 Elite Pro Academy U-16. The league is currently the youth level (U-16) football league in Indonesia. The season started on 16 August.

PSM U16s were the defending champions.

18 teams divided into 3 groups.

Group A

Group B

Group C

Ranking of runner-up

Knockout stage

Bracket

Semi-finals

Third place

Final

Awards 
 Top goalscorers: Eriko Sulastiano (Persib U16s) (12 goals)
 Best player: Eriko Sulastiano (Persib U16s) 
 Best referee: Habib Ferdiansyah
 Best coach: Asep Rahmat Saputra (Persib U16s) 
 Best academy: Persib U16s
 Fair-play team: Persija U16s

See also 
  2022 Liga 1 U-14
  2022 Liga 1 U-18

References 

EPA U-16 2022
Sport in Indonesia